Qixing Mountain, also spelled Cising Mountain or Chihsing Mountain, is a mountain in Beitou District, Taipei, Taiwan. It is located on the Datun Volcano Group and is the highest mountain in the city, at the rim of Taipei Basin. It is also the highest (dormant) volcano in Taiwan.

It began erupting about 700,000 years ago. There was a crater at the peak but it became seven small peaks due to post-eruption erosion.

The mountain has faults running across the southeast and northwest contours, and has volcanic landforms such as hot springs and fumaroles.

Shamao Mountain is a round volcanic dome that looks like a black gauze cap. Shamaoshan and Cigushan (七股山) are parasitic volcanoes of Qixingshan.

This mountain is the source of the name for Shichisei District (七星郡), Taihoku Prefecture, Taiwan under Japanese rule. This district included modern day Xizhi, Shilin, Beitou, Nangang, Neihu, Songshan, and Xinyi.

See also
 List of mountains in Taiwan

References

Volcanoes of Taiwan
Pleistocene lava domes
Dormant volcanoes
Landforms of Taipei